Hermogenes "Jun" Edejer Ebdane, Jr. (born December 30, 1948) is a Filipino politician and retired police officer with the rank of Director General. He is the Governor of Zambales since 2019, previously held this position from 2010 until 2016. He was also the Secretary of the Department of Public Works and Highways from 2005 to February 2007 and again from July 2007 to 2009.

He was a member of the Philippine Military Academy class of 1970, and has a Bachelor of Science in Civil Engineering (BSCE) from the Mapúa Institute of Technology.

Career
Ebdane was the 10th Chief of the Philippine National Police serving from July 2002 to August 23, 2004.

After the escape from jail of Islamic militant Fathur Rohman al-Ghozi on July 14, 2003, Ebdane stated he would be satisfied with any recovery, including "even if he is dead and torn to pieces". He went to view the body after Al-Ghozi was shot dead by police on October 13, 2003, saying the militant was killed in a brief gunfight after opening fire at a military checkpoint. One of the demands of the Oakwood mutiny on July 27, 2003, was the resignation of Ebdane as national police chief, but the mutiny was unsuccessful and short-lived. He was chief of the PNP during the Hello Garci scandal, and admitted providing a vehicle to Virgilio Garcillano, but only when Garcillano was still with the Commission on Elections. He said violence for the May 2004 election was lower than previous years.

After serving as the chief of the PNP, Ebdane was named National Security Adviser, a post he held from August 2004 to February 2005. In February 2005, he was appointed to a cabinet position as Secretary of Public Works and Highways, which he returned to in July 2007, after serving as Secretary of National Defense from February 2007.

Educational life

Bachelor of Science, Philippine Military Academy
Bachelor of Science In Civil Engineering, Mapua Institute of Technology
Master of Arts in Criminology, Philippine College of Criminology
Doctor of Philosophy in Peace and Security Administration, Bicol University
Senior-level courses and trainings
Command and General Staff Course, US Army Command and General Staff College
Incident Management Training, US Counter-Terrorist Training Group
Senior Crisis Management Course sponsored by the United States Department of State
Senior Police Officers course, Singapore Police Academy
Senior Police Executive Course, International Law Enforcement Academy in Thailand
Basic and Advance Intelligence Courses, National Intelligence Training Center and the Special Intelligence Training School

Personal life
He is married to Alma Cabanayan.

Awards
Distinguished Conduct Star
Philippine Legion of Honor
two Distinguished Service Stars
PNP Distinguished Service Medal
Medalya ng Katangi-tanging Gawa
Bronze Cross Medal
Military Merit Medals
PMA Cavalier Award for Leadership and Command Administration
Master Parachutist Badge

References

External links
 Biography at the Department of Public Works and Highways

|-

|-

|-

|-

|-

1948 births
Living people
Governors of Zambales
Secretaries of Public Works and Highways of the Philippines
Secretaries of National Defense of the Philippines
Filipino police chiefs
People from Zambales
Mapúa University alumni
Philippine Military Academy alumni
Partido para sa Demokratikong Reporma politicians
Labor Party Philippines politicians
Arroyo administration cabinet members
National Security Advisers of the Philippines
Grand Crosses of the Order of Lakandula